California's 18th State Senate district is one of 40 California State Senate districts. It is currently represented by Democrat Robert Hertzberg of Van Nuys.

District profile
The district consists of the eastern San Fernando Valley. The district is heavily Hispanic and forms a gateway between Los Angeles and the Santa Clarita and Antelope valleys to the north.

Los Angeles County – 9.5%
 Burbank – 14.3%
 Los Angeles – 23.5%
 Arleta
 Granada Hills
 North Hills
 North Hollywood
 Northridge – partial
 Pacoima
 Panorama City
 Sherman Oaks
 Studio City
 Sun Valley
 Sylmar
 Toluca Lake
 Valley Glen
 Valley Village
 Van Nuys
 San Fernando

Election results from statewide races

List of senators 
Due to redistricting, the 18th district has been moved around different parts of the state. The current iteration resulted from the 2011 redistricting by the California Citizens Redistricting Commission.

Election results 1994 - present

2018

2014

2010

2006

2002

1998

1994

See also 
 California State Senate
 California State Senate districts
 Districts in California

References

External links 
 District map from the California Citizens Redistricting Commission

18
Government of Los Angeles
Government of Los Angeles County, California
San Fernando Valley
Arleta, Los Angeles
Granada Hills, Los Angeles
Los Angeles River
North Hollywood, Los Angeles
Northridge, Los Angeles
Pacoima, Los Angeles
Panorama City, Los Angeles
San Fernando, California
Sherman Oaks, Los Angeles
Studio City, Los Angeles
Sylmar, Los Angeles
Toluca Lake, Los Angeles
Van Nuys, Los Angeles